The Badlands Observatory (IAU code 918) is an astronomical observatory named after the Badlands National Park, located in Quinn, South Dakota, near the city of Wall, United States. The observatory was founded in 2000.
by American amateur astronomer Ron Dyvig, who was associated with the Optical Sciences Center and Steward Observatory of the University of Arizona. While there, he occasionally participated in observing runs using the telescopes on Kitt Peak. Kitt Peak Observatory 
As of November 2016, a total of 25 numbered minor planets were discovered at the observatory. The Minor Planet Center credits these discoveries to Ron Dyvig and to the observatory, respectively. The main-belt asteroid  was discovered by Italian amateur astronomer Fabrizio Tozzi while using the Badlands Observatory telescope remotely via the Internet in 2008.  Asteroid 26715 South Dakota, discovered by Ron Dyvig in 2001, is named after the U.S. state South Dakota, where the Badlands observatory is located.

When the observatory opened in a former medical facility, the town of Quinn installed hoods over the street lights to reduce light pollution.

List of discovered minor planets 

The Minor Planet Center credits the discovery of the following minor planets directly to the Badlands Observatory:

See also 
 List of asteroid-discovering observatories
 List of astronomical observatories
 
 List of observatory codes

References

External links 
 Badlands Observatory Clear sky clock Weather forecasts of observing conditions.

Buildings and structures in Pennington County, South Dakota
Astronomical observatories in South Dakota
Minor-planet discovering observatories